Cannabis in Puerto Rico is illegal for recreational use. Legislation to ban cannabis was passed in 1932, and legislation to legalize medical use was passed in 2017. Although the medical use of cannabis is permitted, smoking it is prohibited.

Prohibition (1932)
On April 19, 1932, Puerto Rico enacted Act 12, "An Act to Punish the Planting, Importation, Purchase, and Sale of Marijuana, and for Other Purposes". The included penalties were a minimum of one month and maximum of one year in jail.

On May 13, 1934, Puerto Rico enacted Act No. 61, in keeping with the 1934 Uniform State Narcotic Drug Act.

Attempted decriminalization (2013)
In 2013, Representative José Luis Báez proposed decriminalization, however polling by the newspaper El Nuevo Día indicated that 26% of those surveyed were in favor of decriminalization, with 70% against and 4% unsure.

Medical cannabis
In May 2015, Governor Alejandro Garcia Padilla signed an executive order permitting the use of medical cannabis.

On July 9, 2017, Governor Padilla signed Act 42-2017, named the Act to Manage the Study, Development and Investigation of Cannabis for Innovation, Applicable Norms, and Limitations, into law, officially legalizing cannabis for medicinal purposes in the commonwealth.

References

Puerto Rico
Puerto Rico
Puerto Rico
Politics of Puerto Rico
Puerto Rican law
Society of Puerto Rico